A written ministerial statement is, in the Parliament of the United Kingdom, a statement by a Minister that puts the day-to-day business of government in the public domain. Written statements can be accessed by the public in Hansard.

References

Political terms in the United Kingdom
Parliament of the United Kingdom
Government statements